Edith Endave is a census-designated place (CDP) in Bernalillo County, New Mexico, United States. The population was 211 at the 2010 census. It is part of the Albuquerque Metropolitan Statistical Area.

Geography
The CDP is located in northern Bernalillo County; it is bordered by the city of Albuquerque to the south, Interstate 25 to the east, the Sandoval County boundary to the north, and a levee along the Rio Grande to the west. The main road through the CDP is the north-south New Mexico State Road 313 (4th Street NW). New Mexico State Road 556 (Roy Avenue) leads east to I-25's Exit 234.

Demographics

Education
It is zoned to Albuquerque Public Schools.

References

Census-designated places in Bernalillo County, New Mexico
Census-designated places in New Mexico
Albuquerque metropolitan area